The following list is a discography of production by Big K.R.I.T., an American hip hop record producer and recording artist. It includes a list of songs produced, co-produced and remixed by year, artist, album and title.

2005

Big K.R.I.T. - See Me on Top
02. "Grata Lata"
03. "See Me On Top"
04. "They Gone Hate"
05. "A Rapper With A Dream"
06. "Twerk A Little Something"
07. "5th Wheel"
09. "Bring It Back"
10. "Jump In"
11. "Love Don't Live No Mo"
12. "Bigger Pimpin'"
13. "Notordia" (featuring C-Roc)
14. "My Life Ain't Rosey"
15. "I Ain't Playin No Moe"
16. "Put Cha Sign In Da Air"
17. "Bottom Ain't The Place 4 a 'G"
18. "Adidas & 1's In Da Club"
19. "Bigger Pimpin' (Chopped & Screwed)"
20. "Throwed"

Big K.R.I.T. - See Me On Top Vol. II
02. "Why Not (Snippet)"
03. "Bring It Back"
05. "Just Touched Down"
06. "Stop Drop" (featuring Alfamega)
09. "Yo Chick, My Chick"
12. "Pull The Drop Out"
13. "Playa Why Ya Hatin'"
14. "Jump In (Remix)"
16. "I Already Know"
17. "Keep It Movin'"
18. "Go Crazy"
19. "3rd Coast"
21. "Big Boi Thang"
23. "Baby Don't Do It"
24. "Adidas & 1's (Chopped & Screwed)" (featuring Jay O)
26. "Highly Anticipated" (Bonus Track)

2006

Big K.R.I.T. - King of the Queen (Hood Fame)
02. "Ya Dealin' Wit A Vet"
03. "Just Touched Down"
04. "Roller Skaten"
08. "Mary Jane (Spaced Out)"
09. "Kingston"
10. "On My Grind" (featuring Max Minelli)
12. "Baby Don't Do It"
13. "Get Ya Issue Straight"
16. "Notordia" (featuring C-Roc)
18. "Bring It Back"
19. "Ridin'"
20. "Everybody Waitin'"
21. "5th Wheel"
22. "Jump In"
23. "Hold Up"
24. "Take Care Of Mama"

2007

Ya Boy - Chapter I: The Rise
01. "Grata Lata" 
05. "Down By the Bay" 
14. "Say Girl"

2008

Big K.R.I.T. - See Me On Top Vol. III
01. "History Remembers Kings"
02. "Don't Lose Count"
03. "Stunt Man"
05. "How You Feel"
06. "She My Biggest Fan"
07. "Best Side Off Me"
09. "Private Dancer"
10. "Grammy Night"
11. "Get Money"
13. "It's A Movie"
14. "Going Places"
15. "Lights Out"
16. "My Last Time"
17. "Boast or Brag"
18. "Can You Dig That"
19. "Something"
20. "King"
21. "When I Get Money"
22. "Blood Money"
23. "Grind To My Grave" (featuring Supamane)
24. "Shawty I'm On"

2009

Big K.R.I.T. - The Last King
03. "From The South"
04. "The Moment"
05. "Get Money"
06. "Don't Lose Count"
07. "Hometown Hero"
09. "Send Me An Angel"
13. "Go Off"
16. "Watch Me Work"
17. "Mary Jane (Space Out)"
18. "Get Up Off" (featuring Big Sant)
19. "Can You Digg That"
25. "Booth N Da Sky"

2010

Big K.R.I.T. - K.R.I.T. Wuz Here
1. "Return of 4eva" (featuring Big Sant)
2. "Country Shit"
3. "Just Touched Down"
4. "Hometown Hero"
5. "Viktorious"
6. "See Me On Top"
7. "Glass House" (featuring Curren$y & Wiz Khalifa)
8. "Children of the World"
9. "They Got US"
10. "Good Enough"
11. "No Wheaties" (featuring Curren$y & Smoke DZA)
12. "Something"
13. "Moon & Stars" (featuring Devin the Dude)
14. "Neva Go Back"
15. "Gumpshun"
16. "2000 & Beyond"
17. "I Gotta Stay"
18. "Small As Giant"
19. "Voices"
20. "I Heard It All" (Bonus Track)

Wiz Khalifa - Kush & Orange Juice
18. "Glass House" (featuring Curren$y & Big K.R.I.T.)

Chris Webby - Best In The Burbs
2. "Problem" (featuring Big K.R.I.T.)

Smoke DZA - George Kush da Button
7. "Good Talk" (featuring Dom Kennedy)
7. "Good Talk/911" (featuring Big K.R.I.T & Big Sant) (Deluxe Edition)
8. "I'm Saying"

Mickey Factz - I'm Better Than You
14. "Get By" (featuring Big K.R.I.T.)

Korleon and Bo Hagon - Luxury Tax
06. "Big Lights"  (Performed by Korleon) (featuring Big K.R.I.T)  
09. "Hustler's Prayer"
13. "Need a Lil Mo"
15. "Im Ill" (featuring Chubby Baby, J-Young and Showtime)

Kent M$ney - Becoming
06. "Nothing Like Me" (featuring Big K.R.I.T.)

Various artists - Jonny Shipes Presents: Good Talk Vol. 9
03. "Tell Me Different" (Performed by Big K.R.I.T.)
05. "My Interpretation" (Performed by Big K.R.I.T.)
06. "If I Should Die" (Performed by Big K.R.I.T.)
07. "Bottom 2 Top" (Performed by Smoke DZA)
19. "My Last Time" (Performed by Big K.R.I.T.)

Nipsey Hussle - The Marathon
17. "One Take 3"

Smoke DZA
 "Always Been (The Smokers Club)" (featuring Mac Miller)

Big K.R.I.T.
 "All Grown Up"

2011

Big K.R.I.T. - Return of 4Eva
1. "R4 Intro"
2. "Rise and Shine"
3. "R4 Theme Song"
4. "Dreamin'"
5. "Rotation"
6. "My Sub"
7. "Sookie Now" (featuring David Banner)
8. "American Rapstar"
9. "Highs & Lows"
10. "Shake It" (featuring Joi)
11. "Made Alot" (featuring Big Sant)
12. "Lions and Lambs"
13. "King's Blues"
14. "Time Machine" (featuring Chamillionaire)
15. "Get Right"
16. "Amtrak"
17. "Players Ballad" (featuring Raheem DeVaughn)
18. "Another Naive Individual Glorifying Greed and Encouraging Racism"
19. "Free My Soul"
20. "The Vent"
21. "Country Shit" (Remix) (Bonus Track) (featuring Ludacris & Bun B)
22. "Shake Junt" (Bonus Track)

Big K.R.I.T. - R4: The Prequel
1. "Sookie Now" (featuring David Banner)
2. "Country Shit" (Remix) (Bonus Track) (featuring Ludacris & Bun B)
3. "Time Machine" (featuring Chamillionaire)
4. "The Vent"
5. "Moon & Stars (Remix)" (featuring Curren$y & Killa Kyleon)

Freddie Gibbs - Cold Day In Hell
02. "Rob Me a Nigga" (featuring Alley Boy)

Smoke DZA - T.H.C. (The Hustlers Catalog)
6. "Gotta Get Paid" (featuring Big K.R.I.T.)
13. "1st Class" (featuring Big K.R.I.T. & Big Sant)

Smoke DZA - Rolling Stoned
13. "On The Corner" (featuring Big K.R.I.T. & Bun B)

Ludacris - 1.21 Gigawatts: Back to the First Time
12. "What You Smoking On" (featuring Wiz Khalifa)

Chamillionaire - Major Pain 1.5
06. "Chandelier Ceiling"

Chris Brown - Boy In Detention
21. "Yoko" (featuring Big K.R.I.T., Berner & Wiz Khalifa)

Jackie Chain
 "Parked Outside" (featuring Big K.R.I.T. & Bun B)

2012

Big K.R.I.T. - 4eva N a Day
1. "8:04 AM"
2. "Wake Up"
3. "Yesterday"
4. "Boobie Miles"
5. "4evaNaDay (Theme)"
6. "Me and My Old School"
7. "1986"
8. "Country Rap Tunes"
9. "Sky Club"
10. "Red Eye"
11. "Down & Out"
12. "Package Store"
13. "Temptation"
14. "Handwriting"
15. "Insomnia"
16. "5:04 AM"
17. "The Alarm"

Big K.R.I.T. - 4evaNaDay: Road Less Traveled Edition
1. "Boobie Miles"
2. "Man On Fire"
3. "Sideline"
4. "Insomnia"
5. "Red Eye"

Big K.R.I.T. - Live from the Underground
1. "LFU300MA (Intro)"
2. "Live from the Underground" 
3. "Cool 2 Be Southern"  
4. "I Got This" 
 Sample Credit: Willie Hutch - "Theme of Foxy Brown"
5. "Money on the Floor" (featuring 8Ball & MJG & 2 Chainz)
6. "What U Mean" (featuring Ludacris)
7. "My Sub (Pt. 2: The Jackin')"
 Sample Credit: Indeep - "Last Night a D.J. Saved My Life"
8. "Don't Let Me Down"  
9. "Porchlight" (featuring Anthony Hamilton)
10. "Pull Up" (featuring Big Sant & Bun B)
 Sample Credit: Commodores - "Say Yeah"
11. "Yeah Dats Me" 
 Sample Credit: Bobby Womack & Peace - "Across 110th Street"
12. "Hydroplaning" (featuring Devin the Dude)
13. "If I Fall" (featuring Melanie Fiona)
14. "Rich Dad, Poor Dad"  
15. "Praying Man" (featuring B.B. King)
16. "Live from the Underground (Reprise)" (featuring Ms. Linnie)

J. Stalin - Memoirs Of A Curb Server
12. "She The Type" (featuring Too $hort & Big K.R.I.T.)

Big Sant - MFxOG
03. "2 Much"
10. "Holdin My Nuts"

Alley Boy - The Gift of Discernment
03. "I Live This Shit" (featuring Big K.R.I.T.)

Curren$y - The Stoned Immaculate
13. "Jet Life"  (featuring Big K.R.I.T. & Wiz Khalifa)

T.I. 
00. "I'm Flexin'" (featuring Big K.R.I.T.)

Nephew - Sticks N' Stones Vol. 1
2. "Street Nigga" (featuring Juvenile & Mob Boss)
3. "Hustler's Prayer" (featuring Smoke DZA & Killa Kyleon)

Eldorado Red - McRado's 2
7. "Rock & Role" (featuring Big K.R.I.T.)

Various artists - Jonny Shipes Presents: Good Talk Vol. 10
05. "5 On It" (Cashius Green featuring Smoke DZA, Big Sant & Big K.R.I.T.
14. "Knock You Out" (Juicy J featuring Big K.R.I.T.)
21. "Me & My Old School (Remix)" (Big K.R.I.T. featuring Slim Thug & Lil Keke)

Fat Trel - Nightmares On E Street
9. "Swishers & Liquor" 
10. "Freak It"

8Ball - Life's Quest
3. "We Buy Gold" (featuring MJG & Big K.R.I.T.)

Moe-D
 "What Dat Is" (featuring Big K.R.I.T.)

2013

Bun B - Trill OG: The Epilogue
02. "Cake"

Slim Thug - Boss Life (album) 
03. "Just Chill" (featuring Big Saint & Big K.R.I.T.) 
04. "84S"

2014

DJ Infamous
00. "Something Right"

Big K.R.I.T. - Cadillactica
01. "Kreation (Intro)"
02. "Life"
03. "My Sub Pt. 3 (Big Bang)"
07. "King of the South"
08. "Mind Control" 
09. "Standby (Interlude)" 
10. "Do You Love Me for Real" 
12. "Mo Better Cool" 
14. "Saturdays = Celebration" 
15. "Lost Generation" 
17. "Lac Lac"

Rick Ross - Hood Billionaire  
16. "Brimstone"

ASAP Ferg - Ferg Forever
04. "Bonnaroo" 
07. "Now"

2016

Maybach Music Group - Priorities 5

03. "Freaky Ho"

2017

B.o.B - Ether
04. "Peace Piece" (featuring Big KRIT)

Josh Waters - 1.4.3 
05. "Art of War" (featuring Res)

Big K.R.I.T. - 4eva Is a Mighty Long Time 
Disc one

01. "B.I.G. K.R.I.T."
03. "Big Bank" (featuring T.I.) 
07. "Get Up 2 Come Down" (featuring Cee-Lo and Sleepy Brown) 
08. "Layup"
09. "Classic Interlude"
11. "Get Away"

Disc Two

03. "Keep the Devil Off" 
04. "Miss Georgia Fornia" (feat Joi)
07. "Weekend Interlude"
09. "Drinking Sessions"
10. "The Light" (feat. Bilal, Robert Glasper, Kenneth Whalum and Burniss Earl Travis II)

2018

Lil' Keke - Slfmade 2 

 04. "Four Season" (feat. Bun B)
 05. "I'm Tired"
 10. "Say Mane" (feat. Big K.R.I.T.)

Bun B - Return of the Trill 

 01. "Trill Over Everything" (feat. Killa Kyleon)
 02. "Recognize" (feat. Big K.R.I.T & T.I)
 04. "Outta Season" (feat. Big K.R.I.T.)
 06. "Blood on the Dash" (feat. Gary Clark Jr.)
 10. "Slow It Down" (feat. Big K.R.I.T.)
 14. "Gone Away" (feat. Gary Clark Jr. & Leon Bridges)

Big K.R.I.T. - Thrice X EP  
 01. "Higher (King Pt. 6)" 
 02. "Glorious"

2019

Joell Ortiz - Monday  
 07. "Learn You" (feat. Big K.R.I.T.)

Big K.R.I.T. - K.R.I.T. Iz Here 
 14. "Blue Flame Ballet"

Big K.R.I.T. 
 00. "Ballad of the Bass (My Sub V)"

2022

Big K.R.I.T. - Digital Roses Don't Die 
 03. "Show U Right"
 04. "Rhode Clean"
 06. "Cum Out to Play"
 07. "Just 4 You"
 08. "So Cool"
 10. "Boring"
 11. "Would It Matter"
 12. "Generational - Weighed Down"
 14. "It's Over Now"
 15. "Wet Lashes & Shot Glasses"
 16. "All the Time"
 17. "More Than Roses"

References

External links
 
 
 
 

Discographies of American artists
Production discographies
Hip hop discographies